Haxhi Ballgjini (born 15 June 1958) is a former Albanian footballer who played for Dinamo Tirana, Partizani Tirana, Vllaznia Shkodër and Partizani Tirana and Lokomotiva Durrës, as well as the Albania national team.

International career
He made his debut for Albania in a November 1976 friendly match against Algeria and earned a total of 15 caps, scoring 1 goal. His final international was a February 1985 FIFA World Cup qualification match against Greece.

Managerial career
Ballgjini managed hometown club Teuta to their first and only league title in 1994.

Personal life
His older brother Shyqyri Ballgjini also played for Albania and they were the first brothers to play for the national side together in 1981 against Finland.

Honours
as a player
Albanian Superliga: 1
 1981

as a coach
Albanian Superliga: 1
 1994

References

External links

1958 births
Living people
Footballers from Durrës
Albanian footballers
Association football midfielders
Albania under-21 international footballers
Albania international footballers
FK Dinamo Tirana players
FK Partizani Tirana players
KF Vllaznia Shkodër players
KF Teuta Durrës players
Kategoria Superiore players
Albanian football managers
KF Teuta Durrës managers